Coon Hollow is a valley in Laclede County in the U.S. state of Missouri.

Coon Hollow was named after Caleb Coon, a pioneer citizen.

References

Valleys of Laclede County, Missouri
Valleys of Missouri